Star Flyer is a four masted barquentine built as a cruise ship, and operated by Star Clippers Ltd of Sweden.  A luxury vessel, Star Flyer is a sister ship to Star Clipper. Both sailed under the Luxembourg flag until 2010, and now sail under the Maltese flag.

See also

 Royal Clipper
 Star Clipper
 Flying Clipper
 Royal Albatross
 List of cruise ships   
 List of large sailing vessels

References

External links

 Official website of Star Clippers, the operator of the ship
 "Clippers in the Andaman" – review of Star Flyer and Star Clipper by Glenn A. Baker in Cruise Passenger
 "Cruise the Jurassic coast" – review in The Australian of a cruise in Costa Rica on the Star Flyer
 Star Flyer at Shipspotting.com

Ships built in Belgium
1991 ships
Barquentines
Passenger ships of Sweden